War resistance in the United States encompasses activities related to war resistance by American citizens and other who oppose military action on the part of the United States. This includes opposition to, and evasion of, military duty. Such resistance may originate from pacifism, antimilitarism or non-interventionism, generally, and may include registration as a conscientious objector to military service, draft dodging, or desertion. Alternativelty, it may be directed towards specific military actions, as with opposition to the U.S. involvement in the Vietnam War, opposition to the Iraq War, and the post–September 11 anti-war movement.

See also
Copperhead (politics)
Aftermath of World War I
American popular opinion on invasion of Iraq
Canada and Iraq War Resisters
Canada and the Vietnam War
Conscription in the United States
Criticism of the War on Terror
Emigration from the United States
Foreign Policy of the United States
Gulf War syndrome
Legality of the Iraq War
List of Iraq War Resisters
Loss of Strength Gradient
Mennonite
New York Draft Riots
Oil Campaign of World War II
The Oil Factor
Timeline of United States military operations
United States non-interventionism
United States v. Burns
Vietnam Veterans Against the War
War Resisters' International
War Resisters League Peace Award
War Resisters Support Campaign

Anti-war movement
Non-interventionism
Pacifism in the United States